Persatuan Sepakbola Pacitan (commonly known as Perspa Pacitan) is an Indonesian football club based in Pacitan, East Java. They currently compete in the Liga 3.

Supporters
Perspa Pacitan supporters' group is known as Pac Man (Pacitan Mania).

References

External links
 

Football clubs in Indonesia
Football clubs in East Java
Association football clubs established in 1958
1958 establishments in Indonesia